Events from the year 1866 in Denmark.

Incumbents
 Monarch – Christian IX
 Prime minister – C. E. Frijs

Events
 

 22 August – SS Ottawa departs from Copenhagen as the first emigration ship between Copenhagen and New Torrk City.
 7 September – The engagement of Princess Dagmar and Grand Duke Alexander Alexandrovich is celebrated at the royal court at Christiansborg Palace.
 22 September – Princess Dagmar leaves Copenahgen on board the steam ship Slesvig.

Births
 1 January – Peter Elfelt, photographer (died 1931)
 5 May – Thomas B. Thrige, industrialist (died 1938)
 3 July – Albert Gottschalk, painter (died 1906)
 15 July – Adolph Jensen, economist and statistician (died 1948)
 31 August – Georg Jensen, goldsmith, designer (died 1935)
 9 November – Georg Carl Amdrup, admiral, polar explorer (died 1947)

Deaths
 16 December – Christian Albrecht Bluhme, politician, prime minister of Denmark (born 1794)

References

 
1860s in Denmark
Denmark
Years of the 19th century in Denmark